James Sorensen (born 18 July 1986 in Melbourne, Australia) is a former professional model and actor. He is best known for portraying Declan Napier in the soap opera Neighbours. Sorensen served in the Australian Army in his early 20s. He completed his PhD in medical research in 2020.

Career
From 2004 to 2010, Sorensen worked as an Australian actor and model.

During his final year at high school, Sorensen was cast in his first major role, Hating Alison Ashley.  He also appeared in various children's programmes and in 2005 played the lead role of Mike in the children's drama series Blue Water High. He has also had guest roles in Wicked Science and Satisfaction and appeared in the short film "Physical Graffiti", which was filmed in Melbourne.

In 2007, Sorensen had started in the cast in the Australian soap Neighbours as Declan Napier, brother of Oliver Barnes (David Hoflin) and son of Rebecca Napier, (Jane Hall). On 30 January 2010, it was confirmed that Sorensen was departing Neighbours but his character was recast as the producers were not yet ready to write him out of the show. It was later revealed that Sorensen quit Neighbours to join the army, but he revealed in an interview that he would return to acting "at some point down the track". However, Sorensen left the army after two years due to injury, and began his academic career in science, after being accepted to study a Bachelor of Biomedical Science at Victoria University; St Albans Campus.

In 2011, he filmed a role in Conspiracy 365 a television miniseries about a boy forced to become a fugitive.

Sorensen completed his PhD in medical research (Paediatric Oncology) at Victoria University and the Australian Institute for Musculoskeletal Science (AIMSS) in 2020 where he was awarded multiple awards including the Vice Chancellors PhD Scholarship, an AIMSS research grant and was nominated for Victorian Young Person of the Year for science and engineering. In 2011, Sorensen completed a course in fitness instruction and trained clients in between the demands of his studies. He also completed a Bachelor of Biomedical Science degree with Honours in 2015 at Victoria University.

Personal life
He is of Danish and Portuguese descent. He has a twin sister and a brother who is six years younger. Sorensen is a keen photographer and also enjoys keeping fit by cycling with his Uncle Harold. He has participated in The Great Victorian Bike Ride twice. Sorensen plays futsal in his spare time and also enjoys travel and has been playing the piano since he was four years old.

References

External links
 
James Sorensen on LinkedIn

1986 births
Living people
Male actors from Melbourne
Australian Army soldiers
Australian male soap opera actors
Australian medical researchers
Australian medical doctors
Australian oncologists
Australian paediatricians
Australian people of British descent
Australian people of Danish descent
Australian people of Portuguese descent
Celebrity doctors
Deakin University alumni
Military personnel from Melbourne
Twin male actors
Victoria University, Melbourne alumni
Models from Melbourne
Australian twins